Ian Gordon Ferguson  (born 20 July 1952) is New Zealand's second most successful Olympian. He won four Olympic gold medals competing in K1, K2, and K4 kayak events, and attended five Summer Olympics between 1976 and 1992. He also won two canoe sprint world championship titles.

Early life and family
Ferguson was born in Taumarunui on 20 July 1952, the son of Gilbert and Winsome Ferguson. He was educated at Palmerston North Boys' High School, and was an all-round sportsperson, achieving in running and rugby union, and becoming the school swimming champion. Ferguson studied at Victoria University of Wellington, completing a Bachelor of Commerce and Administration degree in 1976.

In 1973, Ferguson married his wife, Alyson, and the couple went on to have two children.

Sporting career and honours
At the 1984 Olympic Games in Los Angeles he won three gold medals. In the same year he was named New Zealand sportsperson of the year.

In the 1985 New Year Honours, Ferguson was appointed a Member of the Order of the British Empire, for services to canoeing.

New Zealand's flagbearer at the opening ceremony of the 1988 Summer Olympics, he went on to win another gold medal and a silver medal at that Olympic Games in Seoul, South Korea. He was the first New Zealander to compete in five Olympic Games and his four gold medals was the New Zealand record for an individual haul at the Games until beaten by fellow canoeist Lisa Carrington in 2021. His five Olympic medals is the second-highest number of Olympic medals won by a New Zealander, a record he shares with fellow canoeist Paul MacDonald and equestrian Mark Todd.

Post professional sports
In 1990 Ferguson started a kayak retail and hire business named Ferg's Kayaks.

Ferguson also starred in the NZ TV show Clash of the Codes, having been in the winning team on two occasions.

In 2009, Ferguson began fronting a campaign to build an international whitewater canoeing stadium in Manukau City. Vector Wero Whitewater Park was opened in 2016, with Ferguson as general manager.

Ferguson's son, Steven Ferguson, has also represented New Zealand at the Olympic and Commonwealth Games, both in canoeing and swimming events.

References

Profile on New Zealand Olympic Committee

|-

1952 births
Canoeists at the 1976 Summer Olympics
Canoeists at the 1980 Summer Olympics
Canoeists at the 1984 Summer Olympics
Canoeists at the 1988 Summer Olympics
Canoeists at the 1992 Summer Olympics
Living people
New Zealand male canoeists
Olympic canoeists of New Zealand
Olympic gold medalists for New Zealand
Olympic silver medalists for New Zealand
People from Taumarunui
People educated at Palmerston North Boys' High School
Olympic medalists in canoeing
New Zealand Members of the Order of the British Empire
ICF Canoe Sprint World Championships medalists in kayak
Medalists at the 1988 Summer Olympics
Medalists at the 1984 Summer Olympics